The Miranda Camera Company, originally named the Orion Camera Company, manufactured cameras in Japan between  and . Their first camera was the Miranda T. Many of their products were single-lens reflex cameras for 135 film (35 mm). Unlike many Japanese made cameras, Miranda did not make their own lenses and had to rely on other manufacturers to supply them.

All their SLR cameras, except the dx-3, had interchangeable pentaprisms (released by moving a button or twisting the base of the film rewind knob), and a unique dual lens mount; an external bayonet mount or a 44mm thread mount within the mirror box. 

Unable to keep up with the increasing manufacturing automation of the larger manufacturers, and the increasingly sophisticated electronics of competing cameras, Miranda ceased producing cameras.

Miranda cameras were a line of quality 35mm single lens reflexes, a range of over 30 models between first prototypes in 1953 through to the last production model in 1978. Many had advanced or sophisticated features for their day. Almost all Miranda SLR's shared the same basic lens mount, but the mount complexity increased over the years to accommodate more aperture and metering controls.

Later use of brand by Dixons 
In the early 1980s, the British electrical and photographic retailer Dixons acquired the rights to the Miranda brand and used it on a range of photographic equipment. This included badge-engineered versions of Cosina cameras which were distributed in several European countries.

, Dixons Retail (later merged into Dixons Carphone which in turn became today's Currys plc) still had the rights to the brand in several countries but no longer used it and planned to sell the brand off.

References

External links 
Miranda Camera Historical Society
Camerapedia article

Currys plc
Japanese brands
Photography companies of Japan